Qayabaşı (also, Qayabası, Kayabasby, and Kayabashy) is a village and municipality in the Shaki Rayon of Azerbaijan.  It has a population of 1,208.

References 

Populated places in Shaki District